Copiphora is a large genus of large bush crickets or katydids in the subfamily Copiphorinae from South America and southern Africa.

Taxonomy 
Species include:
 Copiphora azteca  Saussure & Pictet, 1898
 Copiphora brachyptera  Karny, 1907
 Copiphora brevicauda  Karny, 1907
 Copiphora brevicornis  Redtenbacher, 1891
 Copiphora brevipennis  Bruner, 1915
 Copiphora capito  Stål, 1874
 Copiphora cephalotes  Saussure & Pictet, 1898
 Copiphora cochleata  Redtenbacher, 1891
 Copiphora colombiae  Hebard, 1927
 Copiphora cornuta De Geer, 1773
 Copiphora coronata  Redtenbacher, 1891
 Copiphora cultricornis  Pictet, 1888
 Copiphora festae  Giglio-Tos, 1898
 Copiphora flavoscripta  Walker, 1869
 Copiphora gorgonensis  Montealegre-Z. & Postles, 2010
 Copiphora gracilis  Scudder, 1869
 Copiphora hastata  Naskrecki, 2000
 Copiphora longicauda  Serville, 1831: type species (locality Cayenne, French Guiana)
 Copiphora monoceros  Saussure & Pictet, 1898
 Copiphora mucronata  Thomas, 1872
 Copiphora ottei  Naskrecki, 2000
 Copiphora producta  Bolívar, 1903
 Copiphora rhinoceros  Pictet, 1888
 Copiphora steinbachi  Bruner, 1915
 Copiphora subulata Stoll, 1813
 Copiphora vigorosa Sarria-S., Buxton, Jonsson & Montealegre-Z., 2016

References 

Tettigoniidae genera